299 Park Avenue is an office building on Park Avenue between 48th and 49th streets in the Midtown neighborhood of Manhattan, New York City.

History

Designed in the International Style by Emery Roth & Sons, the building was opened in 1967. The building is assigned its own ZIP Code, 10171; it was one of 41 buildings in Manhattan that had their own ZIP Codes .

The site on the east side of Park Avenue, between 48th and 49th Street, was formerly occupied by the original Park Lane Hotel. The building was originally constructed over the primary rail tracks for the New York Central Railroad's Park Avenue main line, which made the building's construction and engineering highly complicated. The foundation of the building was constructed through "ladder tracks", two layers of railroad tracks, not in platform position. The construction was completed without interfering with the operation of the railroad.  In 1980 and then again in 1981, the building suffered damage from large fires—the 1980 fire caused injuries to 125 firefighters.

For much of its history, the building was commonly referred to as the Westvaco Building and was the headquarters of Westvaco.  Today, the company's successor, MeadWestvaco, continues to use the building as a regional office. The building was also the home of law firm Debevoise, Plimpton, Lyons & Gates prior to leaving the building in 1983.

Since its construction, 299 Park has majority owned and controlled by Fisher Brothers, a real estate investment group, that developed the site in the 1960s. Fisher Brothers occupies the top two floors of the building for its headquarters. Prior to the financial crisis of 2008, UBS had owned a 49.5% interest in the building. The bank began an auction for its minority interest in the building in 2009 and sold its interest for $335 million in early 2010, implying a total valuation of just over $675 million. The buyer was Rockpoint Investments, a real estate investment firm. UBS also sublet a portion of its space in the building in 2009.

Tenants
 American Securities
 B. Riley FBR, Inc.
 Capital One
 Carlyle Group
 Cerberus Capital Management
 FBR Capital Markets
 Freeman Spogli & Co.
 GE Capital
 Gener8 Maritime
 Leerink Partners
 Lincoln International
 Sagent Advisors
 UBS Wealth Management
 Traxys North America
 Consulate General of Japan in New York

References

1967 establishments in New York City
Emery Roth buildings
International style architecture in New York City
Midtown Manhattan
Office buildings completed in 1967
Park Avenue
Skyscraper office buildings in Manhattan
UBS